The 1843 New South Wales colonial election, the first in the colony, was held between 15 June and 3 July 1843, to elect 24 members from 18 electoral districts. Each district returned 1 member except for Port Phillip which returned 5 members while County of Cumberland, and Town of Sydney returned 2 each.

Results by district

County of Argyle

County of Bathurst

County of Camden

Counties of Cook and Westmoreland

County of Cumberland
Two members to be elected

Cumberland Boroughs

County of Durham

Counties of Gloucester, Macquarie, and Stanley

Counties of Hunter, Brisbane and Bligh

Town of Melbourne

Counties of Murray, King and Georgiana

County of Northumberland

Northumberland Boroughs

Town of Parramatta

Port Phillip
Five members to be elected

Counties of Roxburgh, Phillip and Wellington

Counties of St Vincent and Auckland

Town of Sydney
Two members to be elected

See also
 Members of the New South Wales Legislative Council, 1843–1851

References

1843